Millbrook Association Football Club is a football club based in Millbrook, Cornwall, England.

History
The club was established in 1888. They played in district leagues, including the Plymouth & District League, until joining the South Western League in 1980. The club were South Western League runners-up in 1981–82 and finished in the top five every season until 1988–89, also reaching the final of the Cornwall Senior Cup in 1983–84. After losing another Cornwall Senior Cup final in 1998–99, they entered the FA Vase for the first time in 2004–05, losing 2–1 at home to Exmouth Town. The club remained in the league until it merged with the Devon County League to form the South West Peninsula League in 2007, at which point they were placed in Division One West.

After finishing bottom of Division One West in 2008–09 and second-from-bottom in 2009–10, financial problems forced Millbrook to resign from the league, with the first team taking over from the reserves in Division One of the East Cornwall League. The club were Division One runners-up in 2012–13, earning promotion to the Premier Division. A third-place finish in the Premier Division in 2013–14, a season that also saw them lose the League Cup final, was enough to secure promotion back to Division One West of the South West Peninsula League.

In 2017–18, Millbrook were Division One West champions, earning promotion to the Premier Division. Following league reorganisation at the end of the 2018–19 season, the club were placed in the Premier Division East. In 2021 they were promoted to the Premier Division of the Western League based on their results in the abandoned 2019–20 and 2020–21 seasons.

Ground

The club play at Jenkins Park on Mill Road. The ground was originally named Mill Park, but was renamed in 2014 after former professional footballer Reg Jenkins, who was born in the village and went on to become Rochdale's record goalscorer.  After retiring he returned to Cornwall and helped run the Millbrook football club. The ground includes a covered stand on one side of the pitch, with other three sides railed off. The clubhouse is located behind one goal.

Honours
South West Peninsula League
Division One West champions 2017–18

Records
Best FA Vase performance: Third round, 2020–21
Best FA Cup performance: Extra preliminary round, 2020–21

References

External links

Official website

Football clubs in England
Football clubs in Cornwall
Association football clubs established in 1888
1888 establishments in England
South Western Football League
South West Peninsula League
East Cornwall League
Western Football League